Gaff Topsail is an abandoned railway settlement located in the interior of Newfoundland, Canada, between the communities of Millertown Junction to the east and Kitty's Brook to the west. The population was entirely composed of railway workers who worked on the Newfoundland Railway and their families.

The Topsails takes its name from the surrounding landscape which includes Main Topsail, Mizzen Topsail, Gaff Topsail and Fore Topsail which are geologically classified as monadnocks. It is a barren land, rocky and windswept and in winter is renowned for its tremendous snowdrifts. The area is known for its spectacular scenery and in winter the huge snowdrifts that played havoc with the railway.

See also
 List of communities in Newfoundland and Labrador
 Millertown Railway
 Newfoundland Railway
 Patrick Kavanagh (Canadian writer): Gaff Topsails (novel)

References

External links 

 Newfoundland Railway - Newfoundland & Labrador Heritage
 Photos of railway displays and memorabilia

Ghost towns in Newfoundland and Labrador